Clubul Sportiv Rapid București, commonly known as CS Rapid București, Rapid București, or simply Rapid, is a Romanian basketball club based in Bucharest, currently participates in the Liga Națională, the top-tier league in Romania. The team represents the basketball women's section of CS Rapid București, a multi-sports club.

Women's basketball section of Rapid was one of the Romanian leading teams during the communist era, winning nine national titles in 1951, 1952, 1962, 1965, 1969, 1972 and 1978. The team also won two Romanian Cups in 1969 and 1995. 2001 marked its last appearance in FIBA competitions to date, in the Ronchetti Cup.

Honours
Liga Națională
Champions (9): 1951, 1952, 1960, 1961, 1962, 1965, 1969, 1972, 1978
Runners-up (1): 1998

Cupa României
Champions (2): 1969, 1995

Current roster

References

External links
 Official website

1934 establishments in Romania
Basketball teams in Romania
Basketball teams established in 1934